Victoria Belle Dilfer (born February 26, 1999) is an American professional volleyball player who plays as a setter. Collegiately, she played for  TCU and Louisville. She was a two time All-American at Louisville and helped the team to the program's first ever NCAA final four in 2021. 

Professionally, she signed a contract to play for Italian Series A1 team Bartoccini Fortinfissi Perugia in the 2022–23 season, before parting ways with the team in December 2022 after suffering an earlier injury during the season.

Personal life

Dilfer played volleyball and was a track and field athlete at Valley Christian High School. She finished her high school volleyball career with 2,495 assists, 870 digs and 223 kills.

Dilfer is the daughter of Trent Dilfer who played in the NFL for 14 years.

Career

College
Dilfer played college volleyball for a total of five years, as she opted to use the extra year of eligibility granted by the NCAA due to the COVID-19 pandemic.

She first attended Texas Christian University and played two seasons there. She was named to the All-Big 12 second team after racking up 1,134 assists during her sophomore year in 2018.

Dilfer transferred to Louisville in 2019 and would play there for the remaining 3 years of eligibility. In her first season with the Cardinals, she led them to the program's first ever NCAA Elite Eight appearance during the 2019 NCAA Tournament. In 2020, she was named the Atlantic Coast Conference Setter of the Year and an AVCA Third Team All-American. In her final season in 2021, she was named as Louisville's first ever First Team All-American and helped the Cardinals finish as the national semifinalists in the 2021 NCAA tournament, only recording one loss on the season. It was Louisville's first appearance in a Final Four in school history. She was a Honda Sports Award finalist in 2021. In 2021, she was invited to train with the U.S. Collegiate National team.  She concluded her Louisville career with 2,675 assists and 501 digs. 

She graduated with a marketing degree while having minors in management and sports administration.

Professional clubs

  Athletes Unlimited (2022)
  Bartoccini Fortinfissi Perugia (2022)

Dilfer terminated her contract with Bartoccini Fortinfissi Perugia by mutual agreement after suffering an injury.

Awards and honors

College

AVCA First Team All-American (2021)
ACC Setter of the Year (2020, 2021)
AVCA Third Team All-American (2020)

References

1999 births
Living people
Sportspeople from Santa Cruz, California
People from Los Gatos, California
Setters (volleyball)
American women's volleyball players
Louisville Cardinals women's volleyball players
University of Louisville alumni
TCU Horned Frogs women's volleyball players
American expatriate sportspeople in Italy
Expatriate volleyball players in Italy
Serie A1 (women's volleyball) players